Cairo  is a town in Greene County, New York, United States. The population was 6,644 at the 2020 census. The town is in the southern part of the county, partly in the Catskill Park. The town contains a hamlet, also named Cairo.

History 
The first European-American settler arrived around 1772, but many new families moved in after the American Revolution. They were coming west from New England. 

In 1803, the town was formed from the towns of Catskill, Coxsackie, and Durham. First known as "Canton", the town was renamed in 1808 to "Cairo".

Geography
According to the United States Census Bureau, the town has a total area of 60.1 square miles (155.8 km2), of which 60.0 square miles (155.3 km2) is land and 0.2 square miles (0.4 km2, or 0.27%) is water.

Catskill Creek flows through the town.

Demographics

As of the census of 2000, there were 6,355 people, 2,579 households, and 1,709 families residing in the town.  The population density was 106.0 people per square mile (40.9/km2).  There were 3,322 housing units at an average density of 55.4 per square mile (21.4/km2).  The racial makeup of the town was 96.87% White, 0.55% Black or African American, 0.33% Native American, 0.22% Asian, 0.60% from other races, and 1.43% from two or more races. Hispanic or Latino of any race were 3.67% of the population.

There were 2,579 households, out of which 29.9% had children under the age of 18 living with them, 51.6% were married couples living together, 10.3% had a female householder with no husband present, and 33.7% were non-families. 28.4% of all households were made up of individuals, and 14.0% had someone living alone who was 65 years of age or older.  The average household size was 2.44 and the average family size was 3.00.

In the town, the population was spread out, with 25.2% under the age of 18, 6.2% from 18 to 24, 26.3% from 25 to 44, 25.1% from 45 to 64, and 17.3% who were 65 years of age or older.  The median age was 40 years. For every 100 females, there were 93.8 males.  For every 100 females age 18 and over, there were 90.1 males.

The median income for a household in the town was $35,995, and the median income for a family was $41,820. Males had a median income of $36,590 versus $25,538 for females. The per capita income for the town was $19,407.  About 6.1% of families and 10.4% of the population were below the poverty line, including 10.3% of those under age 18 and 10.9% of those age 65 or over.

Communities and locations in Cairo 
Acra – A hamlet west of Cairo hamlet on Route 23.
Cairo – The hamlet and census-designated place of Cairo.
Gayhead – A hamlet at the northern town line.
Purling – A hamlet south of Cairo hamlet.
Round Top – A hamlet southwest of Purling.
South Cairo – A hamlet southeast of Cairo hamlet on Route 23.
South Durham – A hamlet at the western town line.
Woodstock – A populated place north of Cairo on Route 32, along Catskill Creek.

Public safety 
Cairo has two fire companies: Cairo Fire District and Round Top Vol. Fire Co. Inc. Cairo Ambulance responds to medical emergencies in the town.

Notable people

Joseph Alden (1807–1885) – born in Cairo, noted academic and author of over seventy books
David Brewster (1801–1876) – born in Cairo, U.S. Representative from New York
Jennifer Connelly (born 1970) – born in Cairo, Academy Award-winning actress 
Jack Diamond (1897–1931) – bootlegger and gangster
Robert Field (1804–1876) – born in Cairo, politician and businessman
John Ashley Griswold (1822–1902) – born in Cairo, attorney, judge and politician
Rob LeDonne (born 1987 in Brooklyn, NY) – attended Cairo-Durham Central Schools, writer for numerous TV shows and periodicals
Charles Porter (1833–1897) – born in Cairo, U.S. Representative from Virginia
Lorenzo Shepard (1821–1856) – born in Cairo, attorney and politician
Thurlow Weed (1797–1882) – born in Cairo, newspaper editor and political boss who promoted, by turns (and sometimes simultaneously), the National Republican, Anti-Masonic, Whig and Republican parties

References

Towns in Greene County, New York
1803 establishments in New York (state)
Populated places established in 1803